Ian Duncan Robertson from the University of Leeds, Leeds, West Yorkshire, UK was named Fellow of the Institute of Electrical and Electronics Engineers (IEEE) in 2012 "for contributions to monolithic microwave integrated circuits and millimeter-wave system-in-package technology".

References 

Fellow Members of the IEEE
Living people
Date of birth missing (living people)
Alumni of King's College London
Year of birth missing (living people)